This is a list of species in the genus Leccinum. , Index Fungorum accepts 135 species in Leccinum.

A B C D E F G H I J K L M N O P Q R S T U V U W X Y Z

A

Leccinum aberrans Sm. & Thiers 1971 – United States
Leccinum aeneum Halling 1977 – United States
Leccinum alaskanum V.L.Wells & Kempton 1975 – Alaska, United States
Leccinum alboroseolum  (J.Blum) Lannoy & Estadès 1994
Leccinum albostipitatum den Bakker & Noordel. 2005 – Europe
Leccinum ambiguum  A.H.Sm. & Thiers 1971 – United States
Leccinum andinum Halling 1989 – Costa Rica; Colombia
Leccinum angustisporum A.H.Sm., Thiers & Watling 1967 – United States
Leccinum arbuticola Thiers 1975
Leccinum arctoi Vassilkov 1978 – Russian Far East
Leccinum arctostaphyli V.L.Wells & Kempton 1967 – Alaska, United States
Leccinum arenicola Redhead & Watling 1979 – Canada
Leccinum areolatum A.H.Sm. & Thiers 1971 – United States
Leccinum armeniacum  Thiers 1971 – United States
 Leccinum aurantiacum (Bull.) Gray 1821
Leccinum aurantiellum E.A.Dick & Snell 1969

B
Leccinum barrowsii  A.H.Sm., Thiers & Watling 1966 – North America
Leccinum blumii Contu 1990
Leccinum boreale A.H.Sm., Thiers & Watling 1966 – North America
Leccinum broughii A.H.Sm. & Thiers 1971 – United States
Leccinum brunneo-olivaceum  Snell, E.A.Dick & Hesler 1951
Leccinum brunneobadium  (J.Blum) Lannoy & Estadès 1994
Leccinum brunneum Thiers 1971 – United States

C

Leccinum californicum  Thiers 1971 – United States
Leccinum callitrichum Redeuilh 1995 – Europe
 Leccinum cartagoense (Wolfe & Bougher) Halling & G.M.Muell. 1999 – Costa Rica
Leccinum cerinum  M.Korhonen 1995 – Fennoscandia
Leccinum chioneum (Fr.) Redeuilh 1990
Leccinum cinnamomeum A.H.Sm., Thiers & Watling 1966 – North America
Leccinum clavatum A.H.Sm., Thiers & Watling 1966 – North America
Leccinum coloripes (J.Blum) Lannoy & Estadès 1993
Leccinum colubrinum A.H.Sm., Thiers & Watling 1968
Leccinum constans Thiers 1975
Leccinum cyaneobasileucum Lannoy & Estadès 1991

D

Leccinum disarticulatum A.H.Sm. & Thiers 1971 – United States
Leccinum discolor A.H.Sm., Thiers & Watling 1966 – North America
Leccinum duriusculum (Schulzer ex Kalchbr.) Singer 1947

E
Leccinum engelianum  Klofac 2007 – Europe
Leccinum excedens (Heinem. & Gooss.-Font.) Heinem. 1966
Leccinum extremiorientale (Lar.N.Vassiljeva) Singer 1962

F
Leccinum fallax A.H.Sm., Thiers & Watling 1966 – North America
Leccinum fibrillosum A.H.Sm., Thiers & Watling 1966 – North America
Leccinum flavostipitatum E.A.Dick & Snell 1965
Leccinum floccopus (E.-J.Gilbert) Redeuilh 1990
Leccinum foetidum Heinem. 1964 – Democratic Republic of the Congo
Leccinum fuscescens A.H.Sm., Thiers & Watling 1968
Leccinum fuscoalbum (Sowerby) Lannoy & Estadès 1994

G
Leccinum glutinopallens A.H.Sm., Thiers & Watling 1967 – United States
Leccinum griseonigrum A.H.Sm., Thiers & Watling 1967 – United States

H

 Leccinum holopus (Rostk.) Watling 1960
Leccinum huronense A.H.Sm. & Thiers 1971 – United States

I
Leccinum idahoense A.H.Sm., Thiers & Watling 1968
Leccinum imitatum A.H.Sm., Thiers & Watling 1966 – North America
Leccinum incarnatum A.H.Sm., Thiers & Watling 1966 – North America
Leccinum insigne A.H.Sm., Thiers & Watling 1966 – North America
Leccinum insolens A.H.Sm., Thiers & Watling 1968
Leccinum intusrubens (Corner) Høil. 1982

K
Leccinum katmaiense V.L.Wells & Kempton 1975 – Alaska, United States

L
Leccinum laetum A.H.Sm., Thiers & Watling 1966 – North America
Leccinum largentii Thiers 1975
Leccinum leucophaeum (Pers.) Bon 1981 – Europe
Leccinum luteum A.H.Sm., Thiers & Watling 1967 – United States

M

 Leccinum manzanitae Thiers 1971 – United States
Leccinum melaneum (Smotl.) Pilát & Dermek 1974
Leccinum molle  (Bon) Bon 1989 – Europe
Leccinum montanum Thiers 1971 – United States
Leccinum monticola Halling & G.M.Muell. 2003 – Costa Rica
Leccinum murinaceostipitatum A.H.Sm., Thiers & Watling 1967 – United States

N
Leccinum neotropicale Halling 1999 – Costa Rica
Leccinum nigellum Redeuilh 1995 – Europe

O
Leccinum obscurum A.H.Sm., Thiers & Watling 1966 – North America
Leccinum ochraceum A.H.Sm., Thiers & Watling 1966 – North America
Leccinum olivaceoglutinosum A.H.Sm., Thiers & Watling 1967 – United States
Leccinum olivaceopallidum A.H.Sm., Thiers & Watling 1967 – United States

P

Leccinum pallidistipes A.H.Sm. & Thiers 1971 – United States
Leccinum parvisquamulosum E.A.Dick & Snell 1969
Leccinum parvulum A.H.Sm., Thiers & Watling 1967 – United States
Leccinum pellstonianum A.H.Sm. & Thiers 1971 – United States
Leccinum ponderosum A.H.Sm., Thiers & Watling 1966 – North America
Leccinum porphyreum (Heinem.) Heinem. 1966
Leccinum potteri A.H.Sm., Thiers & Watling 1966 – North America
Leccinum proliferum A.H.Sm., Thiers & Watling 1967 – United States
Leccinum proximum A.H.Sm. & Thiers 1971 – United States
Leccinum pseudoinsigne A.H.Sm. & Thiers 1971 – United States
Leccinum pseudoscabrum (Kallenb.) Šutara 1989
Leccinum pulchrum Lannoy & Estadès 1991

R
Leccinum rhodoporosum Har.Takah. 2007 – Japan
Leccinum rimulosum A.H.Sm. & Thiers 1971 – United States
Leccinum roseoscabrum Singer & R.Williams 1992 – Florida, United States
Leccinum rubropunctum (Peck) Singer 1947
Leccinum rubroscabrum Heinem. 1964 – Democratic Republic of the Congo
Leccinum rubrum  M.Zang 1986 – China
 Leccinum rugosiceps (Peck) Singer 1945 – United States

S

Leccinum sardoum  (Belli & Sacc.) Quadr. & Lunghini 1990
 Leccinum scabrum (Bull.) Gray 1821
Leccinum schistophilum  Bon 1981 – Great Britain
Leccinum singeri A.H.Sm. & Thiers 1971 – United States
Leccinum snellii A.H.Sm., Thiers & Watling 1967 – United States
Leccinum solheimii A.H.Sm., Thiers & Watling 1966 – North America
Leccinum subalpinum Thiers 1976
Leccinum subatratum A.H.Sm., Thiers & Watling 1968
Leccinum subfulvum A.H.Sm., Thiers & Watling 1966 – North America
 Leccinum subglabripes (Peck) Singer 1945 – United States
Leccinum subgranulosum A.H.Sm. & Thiers 1971 – United States
Leccinum subleucophaeum E.A.Dick & Snell 1961
Leccinum sublutescens A.H.Sm., Thiers & Watling 1966 – North America
Leccinum subpulchripes A.H.Sm. & Thiers 1971 – United States
Leccinum subradicatum Hongo 1973 – Japan
Leccinum subrobustum A.H.Sm., Thiers & Watling 1968
Leccinum subspadiceum A.H.Sm., Thiers & Watling 1968
Leccinum subtestaceum A.H.Sm., Thiers & Watling 1966 – North America
Leccinum succineobrunneum  E.A.Dick & Snell 1969

T
Leccinum tablense Halling & G.M.Muell. 2003 – Costa Rica
Leccinum talamancae Halling, L.D.Gómez & Lannoy 1999 – Costa Rica
Leccinum tenax  Heinem. 1964 – Democratic Republic of the Congo
Leccinum tlemcenense (Maire) Redeuilh 1993
Leccinum truebloodii A.H.Sm., Thiers & Watling 1968

U
Leccinum uliginosum A.H.Sm. & Thiers 1971 – United States
Leccinum umbonatum  Heinem. 1964 – Democratic Republic of the Congo
Leccinum umbrinoides (J.Blum) Lannoy & Estadès 1991
Leccinum ustale (Berk.) E.Horak 1980

V

Leccinum variabile A.H.Sm., Thiers & Watling 1967 – United States
Leccinum variicolor  Watling 1969
Leccinum variobrunneum  E.A.Dick & Snell 1969
Leccinum versipelle  (Fr. & Hök) Snell 1944
Leccinum vinaceopallidum  A.H.Sm., Thiers & Watling 1968
Leccinum violaceotinctum B.Ortiz & T.J.Baroni 2007
Leccinum viscosum Halling & B.Ortiz 2009 – Belize`
 Leccinum vulpinum Watling 1961 – Europe

References

Cited works

 
Leccinum